Mu Ko Samui is a group of islands in the Gulf of Thailand. Together they have a population of 78,000 (2012). The islands are split between 3 different districts : 

Amphoe Ko Samui
Amphoe Ko Pha Ngan
Amphoe Khanom

Table of Islands

Notes

External links

Islands of Thailand
Geography of Surat Thani province
Geography of Nakhon Si Thammarat province
Islands of the Gulf of Thailand